Robbins Airport was an airfield operational in the mid-20th century in Danvers, Massachusetts.

References

Defunct airports in Massachusetts
Airports in Essex County, Massachusetts
Buildings and structures in Danvers, Massachusetts